Henry Maplestone (11 January 1870 – 10 December 1949) was an Australian cricketer. He played four first-class cricket matches for Victoria between 1893 and 1899.

See also
 List of Victoria first-class cricketers

References

External links
 

1870 births
1949 deaths
Australian cricketers
Victoria cricketers
Cricketers from Melbourne
People from Parkville, Victoria